In recursion theory, α recursion theory is a generalisation of recursion theory to subsets of admissible ordinals .  An admissible set is closed under  functions, where  denotes a rank of Godel's constructible hierarchy.  is an admissible ordinal if  is a  model of Kripke–Platek set theory.  In what follows  is considered to be fixed.

These sets are said to have some properties:

There are also some similar definitions for functions mapping  to :

Additional connections between recursion theory and α recursion theory can be drawn, although explicit definitions may not have yet been written to formalize them:
The functions -definable in  play a role similar to those of the primitive recursive functions.

We say R is a reduction procedure if it is  recursively enumerable and every member of R is of the form  where H, J, K are all α-finite.

A is said to be α-recursive in B if there exist  reduction procedures such that:

 

 

If A is recursive in B this is written . However A being recursive in B is not equivalent to A being .

We say A is regular if  or in other words if every initial portion of A is α-finite.

Results in α recursion

Shore's splitting theorem:  Let A be  recursively enumerable and regular.  There exist  recursively enumerable  such that 

Shore's density theorem:  Let A, C be α-regular recursively enumerable sets such that  then there exists a regular α-recursively enumerable set B such that .

Relationship to analysis
Some results in -recursion can be translated into similar results about second-order arithmetic.

More generally, definability of a subset of ω over HF with a  formuls coincides with its arithmetical definability using a  formula.

References

 Gerald Sacks, Higher recursion theory, Springer Verlag, 1990 https://projecteuclid.org/euclid.pl/1235422631
 Robert Soare, Recursively Enumerable Sets and Degrees, Springer Verlag, 1987 https://projecteuclid.org/euclid.bams/1183541465
 Keith J. Devlin, An introduction to the fine structure of the constructible hierarchy (p.38), North-Holland Publishing, 1974
 J. Barwise, Admissible Sets and Structures. 1975

Inline references

Computability theory